Tim Clarke (born 2 April 1982) is a former professional Australian rules footballer who played for the Hawthorn Football Club in the Australian Football League (AFL). He currently works as a coach for Carlton Football Club.

Playing career

Hawthorn Football Club
He was educated at The Geelong College. Recruited from Geelong, Clarke played for Hawthorn Football Club from 2000 until 2008, with a total of 96 games and he kicked 39 goals. Clarke won the 'Most improved' and 'Most determined' awards for Hawthorn in 2004 and 2005 respectively. He was delisted by Hawthorn at the end of the 2008 AFL season.

Coaching career

Richmond Football Club
Clarke became a development coach for the Richmond Football Club in 2010. At the end of 2011, he left the club to venture overseas for a year; he returned in 2013, and was also appointed senior coach of the club's  Coburg. When Richmond ended its affiliation with Coburg entered its own reserves team in 2014, Clarke was appointed coach of the side.

Carlton Football Club
From 2016 until 2018, he was midfield assistant coach at  under senior coach Brendon Bolton.

Gold Coast Suns
From 2019 until 2021, he was a development coach and forwards assistant coach at Gold Coast Suns under senior coach Stuart Dew.

Return to Carlton Football Club
In October 2021, he returned to Carlton to again take up the midfield assistant coaching position under senior coach Michael Voss for the 2022 season.

Statistics

|- style=background:#EAEAEA
| 2000 ||  || 25
| 0 || — || — || — || — || — || — || — || — || — || — || — || — || — || — || 0
|-
| 2001 ||  || 25
| 15 || 6 || 3 || 85 || 64 || 149 || 37 || 12 || 0.4 || 0.2 || 5.7 || 4.3 || 9.9 || 2.5 || 0.8 || 0
|- style=background:#EAEAEA
| 2002 ||  || 25
| 5 || 0 || 0 || 21 || 11 || 32 || 11 || 5 || 0.0 || 0.0 || 4.2 || 2.2 || 6.4 || 2.2 || 1.0 || 0
|-
| 2003 ||  || 25
| 12 || 3 || 5 || 75 || 79 || 154 || 42 || 29 || 0.3 || 0.4 || 6.3 || 6.6 || 12.8 || 3.5 || 2.4 || 0
|- style=background:#EAEAEA
| 2004 ||  || 25
| 15 || 2 || 4 || 113 || 121 || 234 || 45 || 40 || 0.1 || 0.3 || 7.5 || 8.1 || 15.6 || 3.0 || 2.7 || 0
|-
| 2005 ||  || 25
| 21 || 12 || 6 || 188 || 189 || 377 || 97 || 54 || 0.6 || 0.3 || 9.0 || 9.0 || 18.0 || 4.6 || 2.6 || 0
|- style=background:#EAEAEA
| 2006 ||  || 25
| 18 || 12 || 1 || 159 || 183 || 342 || 121 || 36 || 0.7 || 0.1 || 8.8 || 10.2 || 19.0 || 6.7 || 2.0 || 1
|-
| 2007 ||  || 25
| 2 || 1 || 0 || 15 || 19 || 34 || 8 || 1 || 0.5 || 0.0 || 7.5 || 9.5 || 17.0 || 4.0 || 0.5 || 0
|- style=background:#EAEAEA
| 2008 ||  || 25
| 8 || 3 || 4 || 49 || 58 || 107 || 38 || 10 || 0.4 || 0.5 || 6.1 || 7.3 || 13.4 || 4.8 || 1.3 || 0
|- class="sortbottom"
! colspan=3| Career
! 96 !! 39 !! 23 !! 705 !! 724 !! 1429 !! 399 !! 187 !! 0.4 !! 0.2 !! 7.3 !! 7.5 !! 14.9 !! 4.2 !! 1.9 !! 1
|}

References

External links

Tim Clarke playing statistics by AFL Tables
Richmond Football Club VFL Team

1982 births
Australian rules footballers from Victoria (Australia)
Hawthorn Football Club players
Living people
Place of birth missing (living people)
People educated at Geelong College
Geelong Falcons players